Chesias capriata is a moth of the family Geometridae. It was described by Prout in 1904. It is found in Croatia, Italy, Slovenia and on Sardinia and Sicily.

References

External links
Lepiforum.de

Moths described in 1904
capriata
Moths of Europe
Taxa named by Louis Beethoven Prout